Neuengamme is a quarter of Hamburg, Germany, located in the Bergedorf borough, near the river Dove Elbe (a tributary of the river Elbe). In this rural quarter, part of the Vierlande, the population in 2020 was 3,711.

During Nazi Germany, Neuengamme concentration camp was located in Neuengamme.

Geography 
Neuengamme is located in the southeastern part of Hamburg. In 2007 the quarter had a total area of 18.6 km².

History 

From December 1938 through May 1945, the concentration camp at Neuengamme (German: Konzentrationslager Neuengamme) had more than 106,000 inmates—including all sub camps—almost half of them died.

Demographics 
In 2010, 3,479 people were living in Neuengamme quarter. The population density was 168 people per km². 17.7% were children under the age of 18, and 20.2% were 65 years of age or older. 2.3% were immigrants. 54 people were registered as unemployed.

Politics
These are the results of Neuengamme in the Hamburg state election:

Education 
In 2007, there were no schools in Neuengamme.

Notes

References 
 Statistical office Hamburg and Schleswig-Holstein Statistisches Amt für Hamburg und Schleswig-Holstein, official website

External links 

 Webpage of the memorial Neuengamme, retrieved 19 August 2009

Quarters of Hamburg
Bergedorf